The Last Bolshevik is a 1992 French documentary film about director Aleksandr Medvedkin, directed by Chris Marker.

Cast
 Léonor Graser as Dinosaur girl
 Nikolai Izvolov as Guest
 Kira Paramonova as Guest
 Viktor Dyomin as Guest (as Viktor Diomen)
 Yuli Raizman as Guest
 Marina Kalasieva as Guest
 Aleksandr Medvedkin as Himself (archive footage)
 Lev Rochal as Guest
 Vladimir Dmitriyev as Guest (as Vladimir Dimitriev)
 Antonina Pirojkova as Guest
 Albert Schulte as Interviewee
 Rhona Campbell as Guest
 Marina Goldovskaya as Guest
 Yakov Tolchan as Guest
 Sofia Prituliak as Guest
 Yuri Kolyada as Guest
 Michael Pennington as Voice (voice)

References

External links

1992 films
Films directed by Chris Marker
French documentary films
1990s French-language films
1992 documentary films
Documentary films about film directors and producers
1990s French films